The AN/FPS-19 was a long-range search radar developed for the NORAD Distant Early Warning Line (DEW Line) by Raytheon. It was an L-band system working between 1220 to 1350 MHz produced by a 500 kW magnetron. Two such systems were placed back-to-back, one with an antenna that produced a narrow beam to improve range for long-range detection, and the second with a wider fan-shaped beam to cover higher angles at shorter ranges.

The system was developed from the AN/TPS-1, which dated to the late World War II era. Raytheon adapted it to the long-range role by designing much larger antenna systems and other modifications. The first examples activated in 1957, along with the AN/FPS-23 radars that provided low-altitude coverage between the stations. The AN/FPS-23 were removed in 1963, and the FPS-19's were scheduled to be replaced by the somewhat more powerful AN/FPS-30. The declining role of bomber defense in the era of the intercontinental ballistic missile (ICBM) meant these upgrades were not carried out. The FPS-19 remained in service until the late 1980s, when they were replaced by the AN/FPS-117 as part of the newly-named North Warning System.

The UK equivalent was the AMES Type 80, a significantly more powerful radar that formed the basis of their post-ROTOR network.

References

  USAF Air Defense Radar Equipment

External links

Ground radars
Military equipment introduced in the 1950s